Deison Adolfo Méndez Rosero (born October 27, 1990) is an Ecuadorian footballer who plays for CD Juventud and the Ecuador national football team.

Club career
Méndez started out at LDU Quito. There, he has attracted interest from European teams like PSV Eindhoven, Ajax, Internazionale, and Sampdoria. In 2006, he was on trial with Inter. Inter had the intentions of signing him but Méndez did not have Italian citizenship. Within the 09 campaign of Ecuadoran football, Mendez played for Espoli. In 2010, he signed for Emelec.

International career
Méndez was called up to play in the 2007 Pan American Games with Ecuador. He will be called up to play the 2009 South American Youth Championship in Venezuela. On February 10, 2009 Méndez made his first full international appearance for Ecuador starting and playing the entire 90 minutes against England's U-21.

Honours

National Team
  Ecuador U-20
 Pan American Games: Gold Medal

References

1990 births
Living people
People from Muisne
Association football central defenders
Ecuadorian footballers
C.D. ESPOLI footballers
C.S. Emelec footballers
C.D. Cuenca footballers
Footballers at the 2011 Pan American Games
Pan American Games competitors for Ecuador
Footballers at the 2007 Pan American Games
Medalists at the 2007 Pan American Games
Pan American Games gold medalists for Ecuador
Pan American Games medalists in football